The 2014–15 season will be Ferencvárosi TC's 112th competitive season, 6th consecutive season in the OTP Bank Liga and 115th year in existence as a football club.

First team squad

Transfers

Summer

In:

Out:

Winter

In:

Out:

List of Hungarian football transfers summer 2014
List of Hungarian football transfers winter 2014–15

Statistics

Appearances and goals
Last updated on 10 December 2014.

|-
|colspan="14"|Youth players:

|-
|colspan="14"|Out to loan:
|-
|colspan="14"|Players no longer at the club:
|}

Top scorers
Includes all competitive matches. The list is sorted by shirt number when total goals are equal.

Last updated on 10 December 2014

Disciplinary record
Includes all competitive matches. Players with 1 card or more included only.

Last updated on 10 December 2014

Overall
{|class="wikitable"
|-
|Games played || 52 (28 OTP Bank Liga, 4 Europa League, 9 Hungarian Cup and 11 Hungarian League Cup)
|-
|Games won ||  34 (18 OTP Bank Liga, 1 Europa League, 9 Hungarian Cup and 7 Hungarian League Cup)
|-
|Games drawn || 11 (4 OTP Bank Liga, 1 Europa League, 1 Hungarian Cup and 3 Hungarian League Cup)
|-
|Games lost || 7 (4 OTP Bank Liga, 2 Europa League, 0 Hungarian Cup and 1 Hungarian League Cup)
|-
|Goals scored || 105
|-
|Goals conceded || 36
|-
|Goal difference || +69
|-
|Yellow cards || 83
|-
|Red cards || 12
|-
|rowspan="1"|Worst discipline ||  Mateo Pavlović (9 , 1 )
|-
|rowspan="1"|Best result || 8–0 (A) v Hévíz - Hungarian Cup - 13-08-2014
|-
|rowspan="7"|Worst result || 0–1 (A) v HNK Rijeka - UEFA Europa League - 17-07-2014
|-
| 1–2 (H) v HNK Rijeka - UEFA Europa League - 24-07-2014
|-
| 0–1 (A) v Pápa - OTP Bank Liga - 03-08-2014
|-
| 1–2 (A) v MTK - OTP Bank Liga - 31-08-2014
|-
| 1–2 (A) v Újpest - OTP Bank Liga - 21-09-2014
|-
| 1–2 (A) v Diósgyőr - OTP Bank Liga - 04-10-2014
|-
| 0–1 (A) v Kaposvár - Ligakupa - 15-10-2014
|-
|rowspan="1"|Most appearances ||  Emir Dilaver (27 appearances)
|-
|rowspan="1"|Top scorer ||  Dániel Böde (12 goals)
|-
|Points || 69/102 (67.64%)
|-

Nemzeti Bajnokság I

Matches

Classification

Results summary

Results by round

Hungarian Cup

League Cup

Knockout phase

Europa League

The First and Second Qualifying Round draws took place at UEFA headquarters in Nyon, Switzerland on 23 June 2014.

References

External links
 Eufo
 Official Website
 UEFA
 fixtures and results

2014-15
Hungarian football clubs 2014–15 season